Federal Man-Hunt is a 1938 American crime film directed by Nick Grinde and written by Maxwell Shane. The film stars Robert Livingston, June Travis, John Gallaudet, Charles Halton, Ben Welden and Horace McMahon. The film was released on December 26, 1938, by Republic Pictures.

Plot
With inside help, criminal Pete Rennick escapes prison as well as roadblocks and searches set by the local police, now detective Bill Hasford is after him.

Cast 
Robert Livingston as Bill Hasford
June Travis as Anne Lawrence
John Gallaudet as Pete Rennick
Charles Halton as Damon Lauber
Ben Welden as Goldie
Horace McMahon as Snuffy Deegan
Gene Morgan as Hawlings
Matt McHugh as Archie Kilgore
Jerry Tucker as Sylvester 'Scoop' Banning
Sibyl Harris as Mrs. Banning
Margaret Mann as Mrs. Ganter
Frank Conklin as Mr. Beeber
Gene Pearson as Joe Hawlings

References

External links
 

1938 films
1930s English-language films
American crime films
1938 crime films
Republic Pictures films
Films directed by Nick Grinde
American black-and-white films
1930s American films